The Church of St Mary in Christon, North Somerset, England dates from the 12th century and has been designated as a Grade I listed building.

The Norman structure has a three bay nave with a south porch and chancel. The short two-stage tower is central and has a quadripartite vault below it. The door in the porch is round headed and has columns on either side. The outside of the building has five Romanesque corbels including one with double human heads which may be from a later period. The 12th century font consists of a cylindrical stem on rectangular blocks. The bowl is square and decorated on three faces.

The Crook Peak parish is part of the Diocese of Bath and Wells.

See also

 List of Grade I listed buildings in North Somerset
 List of towers in Somerset
 List of ecclesiastical parishes in the Diocese of Bath and Wells

References

Church of England church buildings in North Somerset
Grade I listed churches in Somerset
12th-century church buildings in England
Grade I listed buildings in North Somerset